The 2019 Nagoya Grampus season was Nagoya Grampus' second season back in the J1 League following their relegation at the end of the 2016 season, their 26th J1 League season and 36th overall in the Japanese top flight. They were knocked out of the Emperor's Cup in the Second Round by National Institute of Fitness and Sports in Kanoya and reached the Quarterfinal of the J. League Cup where they were knocked out by Kawasaki Frontale.

Season events
On 23 September, Nagoya Grampus announced that Massimo Ficcadenti had replaced Yahiro Kazama as manager.

Squad

Out on loan

Transfers

In

Out

Loans in

Loans out

Released

Friendlies

Competitions

J. League

Results summary

Results by round

Results

League table

J. League Cup

Group stage

Knockout stage

Emperor's Cup

Squad statistics

Appearances and goals

|-
|colspan="14"|Players away on loan:

|-
|colspan="14"|Players who left Nagoya Grampus during the season:

|}

Goal Scorers

Disciplinary record

References

Nagoya Grampus
Nagoya Grampus seasons